The Indienne river ("Indienne" is the female form in French of "Indian") is a tributary of Lac Le Barrois (lake in the upper area of the rivière aux Saumons), flowing in the unorganized territory of Lac-Ashuapmushuan, in the MRC of Le Domaine-du-Roy Regional County Municipality, in the administrative region of Saguenay–Lac-Saint-Jean, in the province of Quebec, in Canada.

The Doré river valley is mainly served by forest roads.

Forestry (mainly forestry) is the main economic activity in the upper part of this valley; recreotourism activities, second.

Geography 
The Indian river draws its source at the mouth of Lake Vienne (length:  of Y shape;) in the forest area of the unorganized territory of Lac-Ashuapmushuan. This lake is fed to the northwest by the Nevers stream. The mouth of Lake Vienna is located at:
  south-west of the village center of La Doré;
  southwest of downtown Saint-Félicien;
  south of the mouth of the Indian River.

The Indian river flows at the bottom of the Indian bay, on the southern shore of Lac Le Barrois which is a lake in the upper part of the rivière aux Saumons. This confluence is located at:

  west of Lake Clarvaux;
  south of the mouth of Lac Le Barrois.

Toponymy 
The toponym "Indian river" was formalized on September 22, 1976, at the Place Names Bank of the Commission de toponymie du Québec.

See also 

 List of rivers of Quebec

Notes and references 

Rivers of Saguenay–Lac-Saint-Jean
Le Domaine-du-Roy Regional County Municipality